Patrick Francis (born Melbourne 1991) is an Australian artist, athlete and author. He is best known for his colourful depictions of contemporary Melbourne life and as the co-founder (with sister Lesley Francis) of Absolutely Awetistic Arts.  In 2014 he won a Victorian Young Achiever Award and in 2012 was the recipient of the prestigious Art & Australia/Credit Suisse Private Banking Contemporary Art Award. In 2013 his work was included in the blockbuster exhibition Melbourne Now at the National Gallery of Victoria and he has exhibited internationally in India, Singapore and Bangkok. His work is held in the collections of the Art Gallery of NSW and Artbank. He has been a studio artist at Arts Project Australia since 2009.

Early life and education 
Francis, who has autism and limited speech, began painting as a child, alongside his older sister Lesley Francis. He later studied at Brunswick Special Development School where he had the opportunity to first participate in exhibitions and competitions in 2005. Shortly after leaving the school he and his sister co-founded Absolutely Awetistic Arts an organisation which ''promotes disability awareness and talent in the arts.''   In the same year, Francis began exhibiting his work with Arts Project Australia where he held his first solo show in 2014, and where he continues to work as a studio artist.

Career, themes and style 
In addition to co-founding Absolutely Awetistic Arts, Patrick and Lesley Francis have collaborated on a number of publications (Athlete & Artist, 2012; Bird Tales, 2013; Unity & Diversity, forthcoming), in which text and poetry authored by Lesley accompany illustrations by Patrick.  His artwork and community development projects have been multi-awarded. Most notably, Francis was the recipient of the 2012 Art & Australia/Credit Suisse Private Banking Contemporary Art Award and won a Victorian Young Achiever Award in 2014. He is also a successful sportsman who has won medals in both swimming and bowling at national level.

A prolific painter, Francis works primarily with acrylic on paper using bold, dynamic sections of bold colour. The imagery in his paintings draws from the aspects of contemporary Melbourne life, popular culture and art history that contribute to his personal experience, and has been informed by iconic Australian painters such as Sidney Nolan. In 2016 the Sydney Morning Herald noted Francis—alongside fellow Arts Project studio artists Julian Martin, Terry Williams and Alan Constable—for having achieved "significant mainstream success, well beyond the realm of what is normally deemed outsider art." In 2013 Francis’ work was selected for the major exhibition of contemporary art Melbourne Now at the National Gallery of Victoria and in 2016 won the A1 Darebin Art Salon which resulted in a major showcase of his work at the Bundoora Homestead Art Centre in 2017. His work has been acquired for the collections of the Art Gallery of New South Wales and Artbank.

Publications 
Peter Fay, Patrick Francis, Art & Australia: Collection Awards Projects 2003–2013, Autumn 2013, p. 90

References

External links 
Arts Project Australia: http://www.artsproject.org.au/

Artist page: http://www.artsproject.org.au/artworks/6550/Patrick%20Francis

Solo exhibition (2014) details: http://www.artsproject.org.au/event/patrick-francis

Personal website: http://patrick-francis.weebly.com/

Absolutely Awetistic Arts: http://absolutely-awetistic-arts.weebly.com/

1991 births
Living people
21st-century Australian painters
21st-century male artists
Artists with autism
Australian disabled sportspeople
Artists from Melbourne
Australian male painters
People from Keilor East, Victoria